Samuel B. Romaine was an American lawyer and politician.

Life
He was the son of Colonel Benjamin Romaine (1764–1844, several times Grand Sachem of the Tammany Society).

Samuel Romaine was a member of the New York State Assembly in 1816–17 and from 1819 to 1822, and was Speaker in 1822.

His son Benjamin Romaine, Jr. was a well-known Whig politician in the 1850s in New York's 15th Ward.

Sources
 NYT on May 15, 1866
 Speaker election result

Members of the New York State Assembly
Speakers of the New York State Assembly
Year of birth missing
Year of death missing
19th-century American politicians